Fackson U. Shamenda (born 18 September 1950) is a Zambian trade unionist and politician.

Shamenda worked for the postal service, and in 1979 he became the leader of the National Union of Communication Workers.  In 1982, he became the regional representative for the Postal, Telegraph and Telephone International, then from 1994 he served as its African representative.

In 1991, Shamendra was elected as president of the Zambia Congress of Trade Unions, and also as president of the Southern Africa Trade Union Co-ordination Council.  In 2000, he was elected as president of the International Confederation of Free Trade Unions, the only African ever to hold the post.

Shamendra was a supporter of the Patriotic Front.  In 2011, he stood down from his trade union posts, and was elected to the National Assembly of Zambia, representing Ndola Central.  He was immediately appointed as Ministry of Labour and Social Security, and served until 2015, when he retired.

References

1950 births
Living people
Labour and Social Security ministers of Zambia
Patriotic Front (Zambia) politicians
Zambian trade unionists